Seaford Meadows is a metropolitan suburb of Adelaide, South Australia. It lies within the City of Onkaparinga and has postcode 	5169.
A shopping centre with a Woolworths Supermarkets was opened in March 2014.

Seaford Meadows is located within the federal Division of Kingston, the state electoral district of Kaurna and the local government area of the City of Onkaparinga.

See also
Onkaparinga River Recreation Park
History of Adelaide
European settlement of South Australia

References

Suburbs of Adelaide